Jassem Al-Jalabi (Arabic:جاسم الجلابي) (born 21 February 1996) is a Qatari footballer. He currently plays for Mesaimeer.

External links

References

Qatari footballers
1996 births
Living people
Qatari expatriate footballers
Al-Wakrah SC players
FC Juniors OÖ players
Mesaimeer SC players
Aspire Academy (Qatar) players
Austrian Regionalliga players
Qatar Stars League players
Qatari Second Division players
Association football forwards
Expatriate footballers in France
Expatriate footballers in Austria
Qatari expatriate sportspeople in France
Qatari expatriate sportspeople in Austria